AC6 or AC-6 may refer to:
Aviastroitel AC-6, a glider
, a US Navy refueling ship
Southern Pacific class AC-6, steam locomotives
AC-6, a utilization category in electrical engineering, defined by the International Electrotechnical Commission
Ace Combat 6: Fires of Liberation, a video game